The Lebanon Correctional Institution is a prison in the United States operated by the Ohio Department of Rehabilitation and Correction in Warren County's Turtlecreek Township, about four miles west of Lebanon and two miles east of Monroe and about 32 miles north of Cincinnati, Ohio on State Route 63. It is immediately adjacent to another state prison, the Warren Correctional Institution, and was built in the 1950s on land purchased by the state when the Shaker settlement at Union Village closed in 1912.

The prison opened in 1960 and sits on 1,900 acres (7.7 km²) of land, much of which is used as a farm, including the raising of cows. In 2007, there were 2,532 inmates (1,347 black, 1,163 white, 22 Hispanic) with a total staff of 580, of which 340 are security staff. The prison budget for fiscal year 2005 was $41,082,012, an annual cost per inmate of $19,867.31.

Prison inmates manufacture license plates, license plate stickers, printing, and metal fabrication for institutional furniture in the prison industries plant.

The Lebanon prison was featured on an episode of the National Geographic Channel series Lockdown. The episode, titled "Predators Behind Bars", broadcast on March 4, 2007.

Notable inmates
 Dellmus Colvin, Serial killer who committed a series of at least seven murders against girls and women engaged in prostitution in New Jersey and Ohio between 1987 and 2005.
 Billy Milligan The "Campus Rapist" whose defense centered on dissociative identity disorder.

References

Prisons in Ohio
Buildings and structures in Warren County, Ohio
1960 establishments in Ohio